Gurpatwant Singh Pannun is a lawyer and activist who is known for his work advocating for the self-determination of Sikhs in Punjab. He is the legal advisor and spokesperson for the organization Sikhs for Justice (SFJ), which aims to promote the idea of a separate Sikh state, Khalistan.

Pannun has been actively involved in lobbying for the cause of Khalistan and has been organizing events and rallies in different parts of the world, including the United States, Canada, and the United Kingdom. He has also been involved in filing lawsuits against Indian officials and institutions in international courts, alleging human rights violations against Sikhs.

References

Living people
Khalistan movement people